The N22 road is a national primary road in Ireland which goes through counties Kerry and Cork, from Tralee in the west through Killarney, Macroom and Ballincollig to Cork City in the east.

Improvements 
Sections of the N22 were upgraded in the late 20th and early 21st century. During the 1980s and 1990s, a  section between Killarney and the border with County Cork was rebuilt and widened. An auxiliary climbing lane has been provided on the steep grade sections. The late 1980s saw a  bypass of Killarney. In 2004, the Ballincollig bypass west of Cork city was completed. This is an  dual carriageway road built to Motorway standards that connects with the N40 Cork South Ring Road. In 2005,   of the road between Tralee and Farranfore was upgraded. This added to a  section opened in 2002. In August 2013, a new  section of road was added as part of the Tralee N22/N69 bypass project at Ballingrelagh replacing the section of road where the N22 originally ended at the N21 John Cronin Roundabout in Ballycarty. The N22 now terminates at Camp Roundabout outside Tralee on the N22/N69 Tralee Bypass. In December 2022, The N22 from Carrigaphooca to Coolcower has been upgraded to near motorway standard dual carriageway.

Route 
The N22 between Killarney and Cork    via Macroom is the N71 which goes through  Kenmare, Glengarriff, Bantry, Skibbereen, Clonakilty and finally Bandon.

Planned upgrades
Five major projects are in planning for the N22:
Ballyvourney – Macroom under construction
Killarney – Farranfore
Macroom to Ballincollig rebuild
 Cork Northern Ring Road, connecting with M8 junction 18.  (Likely to be designated as N40).
Additionally there are proposals for 2+1 road upgrades to the Killarney – Ballyvourney section. The Farranfore – Killarney and Ballyvourney – Macroom schemes are to be developed as 2 plus 1 roads also. Part of the Cork Northern Ring Road scheme would be designated motorway.

In 2020 works began on a new Macroom Bypass to ease congestion through Macroom. It was opened in December 2022.

It is famous for The Sculpture Road to Killarney where the internationally respected sculptor, Tighe O'Donoghue/Ross of Glenflesk and his son, Eoghan, were commissioned to place sculpted stones along the new part of the road between Killarney and the county bounds to Cork.  Most of the stones were excavated during the building of the road, varying between one and three tons in weight.  The most popular sculpture is that of a rearing horse, set atop a rise along the road near Clonkeen.  Made from ferro-cement over a steel infrastructure, An Capall Mór, the race horse, is accoutered with a helmet featuring a unicorn horn, typical of the war horses used by the Celtic chiefs during their battles. There are broken chains around its front legs, signifying freedom.

Exit list

See also
Roads in Ireland 
Motorways in Ireland
National secondary road
Regional road

References

Roads Act 1993 (Classification of National Roads) Order 2006 – Department of Transport

22
Roads in County Kerry
Roads in County Cork